Nallavanpalayam is a census town to Tiruvannamalai Urban Amalgamation in Tiruvannamalai District in Tamil Nadu State in India . Nallavanpalayam is 4.1 km distance from the main city Tiruvannamalai and 161 km distance from its State main city Chennai.

Near By towns & Villages  with distance are Melchettipattu (2.2 km), Viswanthangal (2.9 km), Melkachirapattu (3.5 km), Meyyur (3.6 km), Tiruvannamalai (3.7 km),. Near By towns are Tiruvannamalai (4.1 km), Thandrampet (11.2 km), Thurinjapuram (21.9 km), Keelpennathur (24.7 km),

Nallavanpalayam Pin Code is 606603, 606 604, 606 605.

demographics
Nallavanpalayam having population of over 7000 providing sub urban to Tiruvannamalai urbanity. it comes under Tiruvannamalai urban amalgamation on Salem (via - harur & thandarampattu) road SH -9. there is one railway station for Palayam as "NALLAVAN PALAYAM" shortly as"N.P"at up coming route of tiruvannamalai-thandaramapttu-chengam-singarapet-uthangarai-samalpatti-bargur-vepannahalli-bangalore (k.r.puram) railway route.

Cities and towns in Tiruvannamalai district